Dublinia is a historical recreation (or living history) museum and visitor attraction in Dublin, Ireland, focusing on the Viking and Medieval history of the city. Dublinia is located in a part of Dublin's Christ Church Cathedral, known as the Synod hall.

Dublinia features historical reenactment, with actors playing the roles of Vikings and Medieval Dubliners (in full costume) and encourages visitors to join in. It has recreations of Viking and Medieval era buildings (houses, etc) and street scenes.

The exhibition was opened in 1993, and was redeveloped in 2010 at a cost of €2 million. As of 2010, the museum was attracting over 125,000 visitors per annum.

See also
 History of Dublin
 Early Scandinavian Dublin
 Jorvik Viking Centre (similar attraction in York)

References

External links

Museums in Dublin (city)
Viking Age museums
1993 establishments in Ireland
Museums established in 1993